Great Rebellion of 1817–1818, also known as the 1818 Uva–Wellassa Rebellion  (after the two places it had started), was the third Kandyan War in the Uva and Wellassa provinces of the former Kingdom of Kandy, which is today the Uva province of Sri Lanka. The rebellion started against the British colonial government under Governor Robert Brownrigg, three years after the Kandyan Convention ceded Kingdom of Kandy to the British Crown.

The rebellion was initiated by disgruntled Kandyan chiefs who were disillusioned by the British colonial administration. It gained initial success with many Kandyan chiefs such as Keppetipola Disawe sent to suppress it joining the rebel forces. Major Sylvester Douglas Wilson, the Assistant Resident in Badulla was killed and the rebels soon gained much control over the region. A pretender to the throne of Kandy, Wilbawe was proclaimed king. Governor Brownrigg established his field headquarters at Kandy and directed military operations against the rebels, who had resorted to hit-and-run attacks, with the assistance of Kandyan chiefs who remained loyal which included Molligoda Maha Adikaram and Ratwatte Adikaram. Brownrigg soon received reinforcements from British India. Following the capture of many rebel leaders, the rebellion eventually fizzled out as the last remaining rebel holdouts were killed or captured by the British.

Background

Following the annexation of the Kandyan Kingdom by the British under the terms of the Kandyan Convention in 1815, certain actions of the British antagonize the Kandyan Chiefs who now found them under their administration. The lack of respect shown by British of all ranks to high ranking Kandyan chiefs and priests further angered them. Two incidents are believed to have trigger the revolt. The first occurred in June 1816, when Madugalle Uda Gabada Nilame proposed to the chief priest the removal of the relic of the tooth of the Buddha from Kandy unknown to the John D'Oyly the British Resident in Kandy. This was followed in September 1816, when he publicly sent offerings to the deities at Bintenne and Kataragama to the overthrow of British and a return of a native king. Madugalle was tried by the British of treason, dismissed from office and exiled to Colombo. His walauwa (house) burnt and possessions were confiscated and sold with the proceeded going to a pension fund for British officers. Another incident took place that angered the Kandyan Chiefs as it directly challenged their traditional rights that the British promised to protect under the Kandyan Convention. This was the appointment of Haji Marikkar Travala, a Moorman of Wellasse, as Madige Muhandiram by the Governor on the recommendation of D'Oyly in September 1817. The post of Madige Muhandiram was traditionally held by families of Kandyan chiefs and it undermined the authority of the Millewa Dissawa. Local chiefs in Badulla, Kivulegedara Mohottala, Kohu Kumbure Rate Rala, Butawe Rate Rala and Millawe Disawa organized local protests against the Madige Muhandiram's appointment.

Revolt begins 
Around this time in September 1817, Major Sylvester Douglas Wilson, the Assistant Resident and Agent of the British Government in Badulla received word that a person of Malabar origin had been gathering a following in the Uva Wellasse region with claims to the throne of Kandy. It was said that this person claimed to be Wilbawe Mudiyanse Doresami, a former priest who claimed to be a relative of the former king and member of the Nayak dynasty. Wilson dispatched the newly appointed Haji Marikkar Travala Mohandiram with a detachment native soldiers to inquire into the suspected Malabar. Having reached Dankumbura in Bintenne, the Haji Marikkar gained information that Wilbawe along with some priests were at Kehelwella with the Veddas. On his way to Kehelwella, he was captured by Bootawe Rate Rala in Wellassa and was killed on Wilbawe's orders on 26 September 1817. After Major Wilson received information of Haji Marikkar's death, he set out from Badulla with a contingent of Malay soldiers under the command of Lieutenant Newman to Wellasse on 14 October 1817. He attempted negotiations with the rebels, but on 16 October 1817, while detached from the rest of the group at a stream close to Bibile with only two servants, Major Wilson and one of his servants were killed by arrows fired by Meegahapitiya Rate Rala and his men. Lieutenant Newman was unable to recover Wilson's body and it was later claimed to have been decapitated.

In response to the killing of Major Wilson, Sir Robert Brownrigg dispatched Colonel Kelly to Badulla from Kandy on 30 October with a force of 271 European and 456 native troops while 339 European and 773 native troops remained in Kandy. Major MacDonald who was the Commandant of Badulla was dispatched to Kotabowa-Wellassa. Additional reinforcements were brought up from Galle, Matara and Hambantota. MacDonald established a fort at Paranagama, along the Kandy-Badulla road where he was accused of torturing and lynching the local population. By February 1818, the British position had deteriorated. They had abandoned all posts in the Uva Wellassa, except those needed to keep the line of communication between Badulla and Batticaloa open. Fort MacDonald was attacked by a 5,000 - 6,000 strong rebel force lead by Keppetipola in February and lay siege till March.

Lord Bathurst, the Secretary of State for War and the Colonies and Brownrigg's superior in London had suggested that the latter consider leaving Kandy and withdrawing to the safety of the maritime provinces to save European lives. Brownrigg instead requested assistance from the Madras Presidency. A relief force under Brigadier Shuldham was dispatched from Madras and landed in Ceylon tilting the balance in British favor.

Leadership
Keppetipola Disawe was initially sent by the British government to stop the uprising, but ended up joining the rebellion and ordering the regiment he was commanded to return to their garrison. Keppetipola Disawe joined the uprising as its leader and is today celebrated for his actions in Sri Lanka. He assisted many regional leaders in providing men and material from various regions.  The other leaders who supported this independent movement were: 2nd in-charge of Gode Gedara Adikaram, Wilbawe, II Pilima Talauve Adikaram, Kohu Kumbure Rate Rala, Dimbulana Disave, Kivulegedara Mohottala, Madugalle Disave, Butewe Rate Rala, Galagoda family members, Galagedara Mohottala, Meegahapitiya Rate Rala, Dambawinna Disave, and Kurundukumbure Mohottala.

Keppitipola went up to Alupotha and joined the fighters having returned all arms and ammunition of the British. Rev. Wariyapola Sri Sumangala of Asgiriya fled to Hanguranketa with the tooth relic casket, resulting in a more vigorous phase of the Great Liberation War, as the Sinhalese believed that whoever possessed this tooth relic would be the rightful ruler of the country. By September 1817, two leaders, Madugalle Basnayake Nilame and Ehelepola Nilame, surrendered to the British, and Pilimatalawe led the rebellion. The British captured Ellepola, who was the Dissawa of Viyaluwa; also captured was a brother of Maha Adikaram Ehelepola, and both were beheaded in Bogambara on 27 October 1818.

The 'Great Liberation War'
The Uwa-Wellassa Uprising was launched by Keppetipola Disawe. With the exceptions of Molligoda and Ekneligoda, many chiefs joined the uprising. The fighters captured Matale and Kandy before Keppetipola fell ill and was captured and beheaded by the British. His skull was abnormal — as it was wider than usual — and was sent to Britain for testing. It was returned to Sri Lanka after independence and now rests in the Kandyan Museum. The uprising failed due to a number of reasons. It was not well-planned by the leaders. The areas controlled by some pro-British chiefs provided easy transport routes for British supplies. Wilbawe, who was said to have a claim to the Sinhalese throne, was found not to have any relation.

Aftermath

The rebellion led to the British colonial government to adopt a scorched earth policy in order to suppress it. This included the killing of cattle and other livestock, the destruction of private property (including homes and stocks of salt) and the burning of rice paddies. In addition to the scorched earth policies, the colonial government also confiscated properties owned by insurgents.

The rebellion also lead the British to eventually enact mass land confiscations from the Kandyan peasantry via the Crown Lands (Encroachments) Ordinance No. 12 of 1840 (sometimes called the Crown Lands Ordinance or the Waste Lands Ordinance), a form of enclosure; the Kandyan peasantry were reduced to penury. The British found that the uplands of Sri Lanka were very suited to coffee, tea  and rubber cultivation, and by the mid-19th century, Ceylon tea had become a staple of the British market, bringing great wealth to a small class of European tea planters. To work the estates, the planters imported large numbers of Tamil workers as indentured labourers from south India, who soon made up 10% of the island's population. These workers were living in harsh conditions and to live in line rooms, not very different from cattle sheds.

Legacy
In the Journal of Uva, Herbert White, a British agent who was present in Badulla after the rebellion was suppressed, wrote:

Gazette Notification
During the Great Liberation war, a Gazette Notification was issued by Governor Robert Brownrigg to condemn those who were fighting against British colonial rule in Ceylon. All those who participated in the uprising were condemned as “traitors” and their properties confiscated by the colonial government under the notification with some executed and others exiled to Mauritius. Successive governments after the independence of Sri Lanka in the past have indicated their intention to revoke this Gazette Notification, but, however, did not take action to do so. The Gazette Notification issued by Governor Brownrigg was brought to Sri Lanka on the instruction of President Maithripala Sirisena. It was submitted to the Parliament and was formally revoked with the signature of the President in 2017. This allowed all those who participated in the uprising to be recognized as National Heroes, and their label as traitors officially erased. A National Declaration was awarded on their behalf to their descendants.

See also
 Kandyan Wars
 Matale Rebellion

References

Further reading
 The 1818 The Great Liberation war and the execution of Keppetipola Dissawe
 Keppetipola and the Uva The Great Liberation War
 Our darkest day.
 From John D’Oyly to Robert O’Blake
 Ceylon under the British By G.C. Mendis
 THE BRITISH IN SRI LANKA
 The Madulla massacre by the British (9th of Dec. 1817)
 The execution of keppetipola Dissawe
 Kandy: the roots of the Great Liberation war.

External links

Conflicts in 1817
Conflicts in 1818
1817 in Asia
1818 in Asia
1817 in Ceylon
1818 in Ceylon
19th-century rebellions
British Ceylon period
Massacres of men
Military history of Sri Lanka
Uva the Great Liberation War
Wars involving Sri Lanka
War crimes in Sri Lanka
Guerrilla wars
19th-century military history of the United Kingdom
British Ceylon
Kingdom of Kandy
19th century in Ceylon
Violence against men in Asia